Fender Japan, Ltd. was a joint venture between Fender Musical Instruments Corporation,  and  and Fujigen Gakki of Matsumoto, Nagano Japan to produce and sell Fender-branded instruments for the Japanese market. The collaboration began in 1982 and ended on March 31, 2015, with Fender's launch of Fender Music Corporation (Japan) taking over the Japanese business effective April 1, 2015 with a Fender-manufactured product line. The Japanese-made Fender guitars sold by Fender Music Corporation (Japan) have since been categorized as the "Japan Exclusive" series.

History
In the late 1970s, Fender was facing competition from lower-priced Japanese-made guitars. The higher-priced Fender guitars were made in the United States and could not compete directly with Japanese-made Fender copies. In Japan, Fender was also losing sales to Japanese guitar brands such as Tōkai, Greco and Fernandes. Since Japanese labor and production costs were much lower than in the United States, Fender moved the lower-priced Fender guitar production to Japan and began negotiations with several Japanese musical instrument distributors.

Kanda Shokai is a musical instrument wholesaler that does not own any retail outlets of its own. Kanda Shokai also owns the brand name, Greco. One of the conditions in the Fender Japan agreement was that Kanda Shokai cease production of its Greco Fender copies. Yamano is another musical instrument wholesaler/retailer with its own retail outlets and was once a part of the Orville by Gibson venture.  Neither company manufactures guitars, instead ordering them from Japanese guitar factories and distribute them through retail outlets. Yamano distributes through its own retail outlets and also various other retail outlets, while Kanda Shokai distributes through various retail outlets, including the Ishibashi chain of music stores in Japan. 
 
The Japanese guitar factories that produced Fender Japan guitars at various times were FujiGen Gakki, and Dyna Gakki and for a brief time Tokai Gakki produced some instruments for sale in Japan only.

Manufacturers
At the beginning of the Fender Japan venture, Tokai was being considered as the manufacturer, but at the insistance of Fender USA FujiGen Gakki was chosen instead. Some FujiGen-made Fender Japan models between 1982 and 1996 have necks made by Atlansia.

 Dyna Gakki took over the manufacture of the Fender Japan models in 1996/1997. The Tōkai-made Fender Japan guitars made for a few months while Dyna got up to speed were not exported.

Terada made the Fender Japan acoustic guitars such as the Fender Catalina.

"Made in Japan" and "Crafted in Japan"

 "Made in Japan" = FujiGen Gakki 1982 until sometime in 1995
 "Crafted in Japan" =Fujigen and Dyna Gakki)1995-

The first CIJ Fenders started around 1995 at the direction of Fender Japan to Fujigen and when Dyna Gakki took over some of the production requirements of Fender Japan. This resulted in the "Crafted in Japan" inscription appearing on some Japanese Fenders during this period. Dyna took over because FujiGen was expanding its own factory operations.

CIJ was used entirely on Japanese Fenders produced from 1996/1997 until 2015, after Dyna took over the Fender Japan manufacturing contract. The Fender Squier range was also brought in line with the Japanese Fenders at around the same time (1996/1997), with the CIJ inscription being used.

Timeline

1982: Fender Japan starts production with FujiGen Gakki having the manufacturing contract.  The "Made in Japan" (MIJ) logo is used.

1984: CBS sells Fender to its current owners and while waiting for a new US factory to begin production, Fender Japan models and leftover US stock were mostly sold in the US for a few years.

1995: The first "Crafted in Japan" (CIJ) models start appearing due to Dyna Gakki taking over some of the manufacturing while FujiGen Gakki were expanding their operations.

1996/1997: "Crafted in Japan" (CIJ) is used instead of "Made in Japan" (MIJ) Dyna Gakki take over the manufacturing contract from FujiGen Gakki.

2015: Fender, Yamano and Kanda Shokai end the Fender Japan joint venture on March 31, 2015. Fender took over the Japanese business effective April 1, 2015.

References

Sources 
2005 Interview with Mr Shohei Adachi president of Tōkai Gakki
1986/1987 tour of Fujigen factory, Rainer Daeschler
 FujiGen Gakki History
 Atlansia

Fender Musical Instruments Corporation
Guitar manufacturing companies
1982 establishments in Japan
2015 disestablishments in Japan
Musical instrument manufacturing companies of Japan